The Ludwick Rudisel Tannery House, also known as Motter Place, is a historic home located at Taneytown, Carroll County, Maryland, United States. The main block is constructed of brick on a fieldstone foundation, five bays in length, two deep, with an original slate roof, built about 1807. Attached is a two-story, two-bay-long brick kitchen. The house features Georgian massing and fine Federal detailing.

The Ludwick Rudisel Tannery House was listed on the National Register of Historic Places in 2006.

References

External links
, including photo in 1980, at Maryland Historical Trust

Houses completed in 1807
Houses on the National Register of Historic Places in Maryland
Houses in Carroll County, Maryland
Federal architecture in Maryland
Georgian architecture in Maryland
Taneytown, Maryland
National Register of Historic Places in Carroll County, Maryland